Randolph County is the name of eight counties in the United States:
Randolph County, Alabama
Randolph County, Arkansas
Randolph County, Georgia
Randolph County, Illinois
Randolph County, Indiana
Randolph County, Missouri
Randolph County, North Carolina
Randolph County, West Virginia